Tobacco BY-2 cells is a cell line of plant cells, which was established from a callus induced on a seedling of Nicotiana tabacum cv. BY-2 (cultivar Bright Yellow - 2 of the tobacco plant).

Overview
Tobacco BY-2 cells are nongreen, fast growing plant cells which can multiply their numbers up to 100-fold within one week in adequate culture medium and good culture conditions. This cultivar of tobacco is kept as a cell culture and more specifically as cell suspension culture (a specialized population of cells growing in liquid medium, they are raised by scientists in order to study a specific biological property of a plant cell). In cell suspension cultures, each of the cells is floating independently or at most only in short chains in a culture medium. Each of the cells has similar properties to the others. The model plant system is comparable to HeLa cells for human research. Because the organism is relatively simple and predictable it makes the study of biological processes easier, and can be an intermediate step towards understanding more complex organisms. They are used by plant physiologists and molecular biologists as a model organism.

They are used as model systems for higher plants because of their relatively high homogeneity and high growth rate, featuring still general behaviour of plant cell. The diversity of cell types within any part of a naturally grown plant (in vivo) makes it very difficult to investigate and understand some general biochemical phenomena of living plant cells. The transport of a solute in or out of the cell, for example, is difficult to study because the specialized cells in a multicellular organism behave differently. Cell suspension cultures such as tobacco BY-2 provide good model systems for these studies at the level of a single cell and its compartments because tobacco BY-2 cells behave very similarly to one another. The influence of neighbouring cells behavior is in the suspension is not as important as it would be in an intact plant. As a result any changes observed after a stimulus is applied can be statistically correlated and it could be decided if these changes are reactions to the stimulus or just merely coincidental. In this moment BY-2 cells are relatively well understood and often used in research. This model plant system is especially useful for studies of cell division, cytoskeletons, plant hormone signaling, intracellular trafficking, and organelle differentiation.

References
	
Nagata T, Nemoto Y, Hasezawa S (1992) Tobacco BY-2 cell line as the "HeLa" cell in the cell biology of higher plants. International Review of Cytology 132, 1-30

External links
What is BY-2, Transcriptome Analysis of BY2 project page.
Cell and Molecular Biology of Tobacco BY-2 cells: 
The book compiling extensive knowledge on tobacco BY-2 cells: Edited by Nagata, Toshiyuki; Hasezawa, Seiichiro; Inzé, Dirk
The second book compiling extensive knowledge on tobacco BY-2 cells: Edited by Nagata, Toshiyuki; Matsuoka, Ken; Inzé, Dirk
Tobacco BY-2 cell suspension proteome database
Pectin hypothesis for Tobacco BY-2 cells. Why chains? 2,4-D promotes the formation of a protective gelatinous polysaccharide in cell wall.  This knowledge is based on four concentrations of 2,4-D and comparison morphology of the sixth day of cultivation. Thus, 2,4-D is a stress factor in any quantity and cell division is unregulated. Thus, the results of all studies on plant suspensions are distorted. Therefore, all results of the studies on plant suspensions can be scratched. Katerina Muselikova, GLOBAL CHANGE RESEARCH INSTITUTE Academy of Sciences, Czech Republic; Tobacco BY-2 cells - Pectin hypothesis  Edited by Muselikova 
Pectin hypothesis - successfully defended at Mendel University in Brno (2012), Czech Republic:  Edited by Muselikova

Plant cell lines
Tobacco